Cortinarius sinapicolor is a species of fungus in the family Cortinariaceae native to Australia.

External links

sinapicolor
Fungi described in 1933
Fungi native to Australia
Taxa named by John Burton Cleland